Year 1046 (MXLVI) was a common year starting on Wednesday (link will display the full calendar) of the Julian calendar.

Events 
 By place 
 Europe 
 Autumn – King Henry III (the Black) travels to Italy to secure the imposition of Guido da Velate, archbishop of Milan, and other similarly loyal candidates in other sees (like Ravenna, Verona and Modena). 
 Vatha Pagan Revolt: King Peter Orseolo (the Venetian) is overthrown after a 2-year reign. Bishops Gerard of Csanád and Bystrík (or Bestricus) are stoned to death in Budapest (Hungary).

 Britain 
 Ealdred, bishop of Worcester, leads troops from England on an unsuccessful punitive raid against the Welsh leaders Gruffydd ap Rhydderch, Rhys ap Rhydderch and Gruffydd ap Llywelyn.

 Asia 
 Bao Zheng (Lord Bao), a Chinese government officer during the reign of Emperor Ren Zong of the Song Dynasty, writes a memorial to the throne. He warns about governmental corruption – and a foreseeable bankruptcy of the Chinese iron industry – if increasingly poorer families continued to be listed on the register for iron-smelting households (while rich households avoid being listed for fear of financial calamity). Apparently the government heeds the warning, and produces more iron products by the year 1078 than China ever had before.
 Munjong is crowned the 11th king of Goryeo (Korea).

 By topic 
 Exploration 
 March 5 – Nasir Khusraw begins his 7-year Middle Eastern (19,000-kilometre) journey, which he later describes in the book Safarnāmé.

 Religion 
 Summer – Ex-Pope Benedict IX gives up a renewed attempt to reclaim the papal throne in Rome; Sylvester III reasserts his claim. 
 December 20 – Pope Gregory VI is accused of simony at the Council of Sutri, and abdicates as pope of the Catholic Church.
 December 25 – Pope Clement II succeeds Gregory VI as the 149th pope, and crowns Henry III as Holy Roman Emperor.
 Hildesheim Cathedral (Germany) is largely destroyed by fire.

Births 
 May 8 – Constance, queen of Castile and León (d. 1093)
 Afridun I (the Martyr), ruler (shah) of Shirvan (d. 1120) 
 Bernard of Thiron, founder of the Order of Tiron (d. 1117)
 Ingegerd, queen of Denmark and Sweden (approximate date)
 Leo Marsicanus (or Ostiensis), Italian cardinal (d. 1115)
 Masud Sa'd Salman, Persian poet and writer (d. 1121)
 Matilda, margravine of Tuscany (d. 1115)

Deaths 
 January 24 – Eckard II (or Ekkehard), German nobleman (b. 985)
 February 26 – Fujiwara no Sanesuke, Japanese nobleman (b. 957)
 June 24 – Jeongjong II, king of Goryeo (b. 1018)
 July 18 – Elijah, bishop of Beth Nuhadra (b. 975)
 Art Uallach Ua Ruairc, king of Connacht
 Bystrík (or Bestricus), Hungarian bishop 
 Eido II (or Egidius), bishop of Meissen (or 1045)
 Geoffrey II, count of Gâtinais (approximate date)
 Gerard of Csanád, Hungarian missionary-bishop
 Gothelo II, duke of Lower Lorraine (b. 1008)
 Lyfing of Winchester, English abbot and bishop
 Oliba, Spanish count, abbot and bishop
 Richard of Verdun, French abbot (b. 970)
 William I (Iron Arm), Norman nobleman

References